The Japanese sea lion (Zalophus japonicus) (Korean:강치, 바다사자) was an aquatic mammal that became extinct in the 1970s. It was considered to be a subspecies of the related California sea lion (Z. californianus) until 2003. They inhabited the Sea of Japan, especially around the coastal areas of the Japanese Archipelago and the Korean Peninsula. They generally bred on sandy beaches which were open and flat, but sometimes in rocky areas. They were hunted commercially in the 1900s, leading to their extinction.

Taxonomy

Prior to 2003, it was considered to be a subspecies of California sea lion as Zalophus californianus japonicus. However, it was subsequently reclassified as a separate species. DNA analysis in 2007 estimated that the divergence point between the two sea lions took place around 2 million years ago (mya) in the early Pleistocene.

Several taxidermied specimens can be found in Japan and in the National Museum of Natural History, Leiden, the Netherlands, bought by Philipp Franz von Siebold. The British Museum possesses a pelt and four skull specimens.

Description

Distribution and habitat
Japanese sea lions were found along the northwest Pacific coastline, specifically in Japan, Korea, southern Kamchatka Peninsula, and the Sakhalin Island. However, they may not have existed in Kamchatka, with their northernmost range extending only to the Kuril Islands. Sightings of individual Japanese sea lions still persist in Korea, but these are probably misidentified Steller's sea lions (Eumetopias jubatus). The only reliable report may have been of an individual shot at Moneron Island in 1949.

Old Korean accounts also describe that the sea lion and spotted seal (Phoca largha) were found in broad area containing the BoHai Sea, the Yellow Sea, and Sea of Japan. The sea lions and seals left relevant place names all over the coast line of Japan, such as Ashika-iwa (海驢岩 or 海鹿岩, sea lion rock) and Ashika-jima (海獺島 or 海鹿島, sea lion island), and Cape Inubō (犬吠埼, dog-barking point) because of their howls to compared to dog's barking. Bones of Z. japonicus dating to 3500–2000 BC were found in the Shell Mound in Dongsam-dong, Busan. Genetic evidence confirms the former presence of Z. japonicus on the Liancourt rocks.

They usually resided on flat, open, and sandy beaches, but rarely in rocky areas. Their preference was to rest in caves.

Exploitation and extinction

Many bones of the Japanese sea lion have been excavated from shell middens from the Jōmon period in Japan while an 18th-century encyclopedia, Wakan Sansai Zue, describes that the meat was not tasty and they were only used to render oil for oil lamps. Valuable oil was extracted from the skin, its internal organs were used to make expensive medicine, and its whiskers and skin were used as pipe cleaners and leather goods, respectively. At the turn of the 20th century, they were captured for use in circuses.

Harvest records from Japanese commercial fishermen in the early 1900s show that as many as 3,200 sea lions were harvested at the turn of the century, and overhunting caused harvest numbers to fall drastically to 300 sea lions by 1915 and to a few dozen sea lions by the 1930s. Japanese commercial harvest of Japanese sea lions ended in the 1940s when the species became virtually extinct. In total, Japanese trawlers harvested as many as 16,500 sea lions, enough to cause their extinction.  Submarine warfare during World War II is even believed to have contributed to their habitat destruction.  The most recent sightings of Z. japonicus are from the 1970s, with the last confirmed record being a juvenile specimen captured in 1974 off the coast of Rebun Island, northern Hokkaido. There were a few unconfirmed sightings in 1983 and 1985. The last credible documentation was made in 1951 on the Liancourt Rocks reporting 50 to 60 animals. In any case, it was one of the most recent marine mammal extinctions to occur, alongside the Caribbean monk seal which went extinct at around the same time.

Attempted revival

In 2007, the South Korean Ministry of Environment announced that South Korea, North Korea, Russia, and China will collaborate on bringing back sea lions to the Sea of Japan, starting with a search for any Japanese sea lions that might still be alive. The National Institute of Environmental Research of South Korea was commissioned to conduct feasibility research for this project. If the animal cannot be found, the South Korean government plans to relocate California sea lions from the United States. The South Korean Ministry of Environment supports the effort because of the symbolism, national concern, the restoration of the ecological system, and possible ecotourism.

Post-extinction claimed sightings or vagrant records
Sightings of single sea lions of unclear identities have been reported at Iwami, Tottori in July 2003, and on Koshikijima Islands in March, 2016. Both animals were positively identified as Otariidae based on photographs, but their identities are unclear.

References

External links

Zalophus
Extinct carnivorans
Extinct animals of Japan
Mammal extinctions since 1500
Extinct mammals of Asia
Species made extinct by human activities
1974 in the environment
Mammals of Japan
Mammals of Korea
Mammals of Russia
Pinnipeds of Asia
Mammals described in 1866
Taxa named by Wilhelm Peters